Žiga Pance (born January 1, 1989) is a Slovenian professional ice hockey forward who is currently playing with HK Olimpija of the ICE Hockey League (ICEHL). He participated at several IIHF World Championships as a member of the Slovenia men's national ice hockey team.

Playing career
He joined Italian club, HC Bolzano, from his original hometown club, HDD Olimpija Ljubljana, as a free agent on October 16, 2013.

On March 30, 2015, after two season in Bolzano, Pance left as a free agent to sign with fellow EBEL team, EC VSV. In the 2015–16 season, Pance built upon his EBEL career in recording 16 goals and 36 points in 49 games.

As a free agent at the conclusion of the season, Pance moved to local rivals, EC KAC, on a one-year contract on May 2, 2016.

Career statistics

Regular season and playoffs

International

References

External links
 Profile at SiOL portal

1989 births
Living people
Bolzano HC players
Dornbirn Bulldogs players
DVTK Jegesmedvék players
HDD Olimpija Ljubljana players
Ice hockey players at the 2014 Winter Olympics
Ice hockey players at the 2018 Winter Olympics
EC KAC players
Olympic ice hockey players of Slovenia
Oshawa Generals players
Slovenian ice hockey right wingers
Sportspeople from Ljubljana
EC VSV players
HC Slovan Bratislava players
Slovenian expatriate sportspeople in Slovakia
Slovenian expatriate sportspeople in Italy
Slovenian expatriate sportspeople in Canada
Slovenian expatriate sportspeople in Austria
Slovenian expatriate sportspeople in Hungary
Expatriate ice hockey players in Slovakia
Expatriate ice hockey players in Italy
Expatriate ice hockey players in Canada
Expatriate ice hockey players in Austria
Expatriate ice hockey players in Hungary
Slovenian expatriate ice hockey people
HK Olimpija players